Sudesna is a genus of cribellate araneomorph spiders in the family Dictynidae, and was first described by Pekka T. Lehtinen in 1967.

Species
 it contains seven species:
Sudesna anaulax (Simon, 1908) – Australia (Western Australia)
Sudesna circularis Zhang & Li, 2011 – China
Sudesna digitata Zhang & Li, 2011 – China
Sudesna flavipes (Hu, 2001) – China
Sudesna grammica (Simon, 1893) – Philippines
Sudesna grossa (Simon, 1906) – India
Sudesna hedini (Schenkel, 1936) (type) – China, Korea

References

Araneomorphae genera
Dictynidae
Spiders of Asia
Spiders of Australia
Taxa named by Pekka T. Lehtinen